Greyfriars was a monastic house in Bedford, England. The house of the Grey Friars (or Franciscan friars) was founded either by Mabilea de Plateshull (Lady Mabel de Pattishall) (according to Leland) or John St. John (according to Valor Ecclesiasticus) during the reign of King Edward II, and their church was dedicated on 3 November 1295.  The date of the arrival of the Franciscans in the town is not known.

The revenue of the friary was valued at £3 13s. 2d (according to Valor Ecclesiasticus, or £5 per year according to William Cobbett) at the time of the Dissolution of the Monasteries.  The friars formally acknowledged the supremacy of the King on 14 May 1534, and the deed of surrender was dated 3 October 1535, and subsequently, in 1539 the property was granted to John Gostwyke.

Burials
John de Mowbray, 3rd Baron Mowbray
Mabel de Grandison, wife of John de Pateshull

See also
 List of monastic houses in Bedfordshire

References

Order of Friars Minor
Monasteries in Bedfordshire
Bedford